The Pennsylvania Farm Show is an annual agricultural exposition celebrating Pennsylvania's agriculture industry, held every January at the Pennsylvania Farm Show Complex & Expo Center, located in Harrisburg, Pennsylvania. It is the largest indoor agricultural event held in the United States. The Farm Show Complex houses  under its roof, spread throughout eleven halls, including three arenas. The annual event is free to the public and attracts over half a million visitors. This event was first held in 1917 as Pennsylvania's State Fair. The 2021 rendition of the Farm Show, however, was entirely virtual for the first time in its history due to the COVID-19 pandemic.

The Farm Show has over 10,000 competitive events spread over 35 departments. 
All exhibits are owned, grown, or fashioned by residents of Pennsylvania.

In addition to these events, the Farm Show offers hands-on learning activities such as lace making, wheat weaving, and blacksmithing. The Farm Show also features a portable merry-go-round carnival ride that was manufactured by the Allan Herschell Company in 1946. Antique agricultural equipment is often displayed at the show, alongside new farming technology.

Notes

See also

Agriculture in Pennsylvania
Agricultural show
Horse show
Livestock show

External links
Pennsylvania Farm Show official site
Latest PA Farm Show news, photos and videos from The Patriot-News

References

History of Pennsylvania
Pennsylvania culture
State fairs
Agricultural shows in the United States
Culture of Harrisburg, Pennsylvania
Tourist attractions in Dauphin County, Pennsylvania
Tourist attractions in Harrisburg, Pennsylvania
January events
Festivals established in 1917
1917 establishments in Pennsylvania
Agriculture in Pennsylvania